John MacDonald (born 15 April 1961) is a Scottish former footballer who played as a striker for Rangers between 1978 and 1986 before moving to Barnsley. He made 230 appearances for Rangers, scoring 77 goals, and won the 1981 Scottish Cup and the Scottish League Cup in 1982 and 1984.

References

External links
 

1961 births
Airdrieonians F.C. (1878) players
Barnsley F.C. players
Charlton Athletic F.C. players
Dumbarton F.C. players
Association football forwards
Inverness Caledonian Thistle F.C. players
Living people
Rangers F.C. players
Scarborough F.C. players
Scottish Football League players
Scottish footballers
English Football League players
Scotland under-21 international footballers
Scotland youth international footballers
Fort William F.C. players